Quincy Taylor (born March 31, 1991) is an American professional basketball player who currently plays for the Surrey Scorchers in the British Basketball League.

College career 
Taylor spent three years playing at the University of Alabama at Birmingham. After taking a year out per NCAA transfer rule, he joined Longwood University for his senior year and was named captain. During his collegiate career, Taylor averaged 7.5 points, 2.4 assists, 2.1 rebounds and 1.0 steals per game.

Professional career 
After going undrafted in the 2015 NBA draft, Taylor turned professional with British Basketball League team the Cheshire Phoenix in January 2016. He averaged 14.7 points per game while making 15 appearances in his debut season.

Taylor joined league rivals the Surrey Scorchers ahead of the 2016–17 season, where he averaged an improved 15.82 points over 33 games. His performances saw him named the fan's MVP.

In August 2018, Taylor re-signed for the Surrey Scorchers ahead of the 2018–19 British Basketball League season.

At the start of the 2022-23 season, Taylor rejoined the Surrey Scorchers, under a new head coach, Lloyd Gardener. Halfway through the season he left the club for personal reasons.

References 

1991 births
Living people
American expatriate basketball people in Estonia
American expatriate basketball people in Lithuania
American expatriate basketball people in Mexico
American expatriate basketball people in the United Kingdom
American men's basketball players
Basketball players from Wichita, Kansas
British Basketball League players
Cheshire Phoenix players
Guards (basketball)
Halcones de Ciudad Obregón players
Longwood Lancers men's basketball players
Surrey Scorchers players
UAB Blazers men's basketball players